Hans Hækkerup (3 December 1945 – 22 December 2013) was a Danish politician who has served as a member of parliament (Folketing) for the Social Democratic party and as the Minister of Defence from 1993 to 2000 under Poul Nyrup Rasmussen.

Early life
Hækkerup was born in Frederiksberg, Denmark. He was the son of former Minister of Economy Per Hækkerup and former Member of Parliament Grete Hækkerup. He graduated from the Frederiksborg Gymnasium (State School) in 1964 and received a Master of Arts in Economics from the University of Copenhagen in 1973.

Career
After working in several government ministries, Hækkerup was elected to the Folketing in 1979. He held several committee memberships including the Committee on Danish Security Policy, the Committee on Greenlandic Affairs, the Committee on Foreign Affairs and the Committee on Foreign Policy. He was Chairman of the Defense Committee from 1991 to 1993.

As Minister of Defence in the administration of Poul Nyrup Rasmussen from 1993 to 2000, Hækkerup is considered to have contributed actively to the escalation of Danish military efforts abroad – including Denmark's participation in NATO's military action in Yugoslavia in 1999. He served as Special Representative of the Secretary-General for Kosovo from January to December 2001.

After leaving office, Hækkerup worked as a research director at the Royal Danish Defence College's China Studies at the Institute for Strategy.

Personal life
Hækkerup was previously married to Lisa Hækkerup. In 2011, Hækkerup was living in Mexico, where his second wife, Susanne Rumohr Hækkerup, was the Danish ambassador. He had five sons: three from his first marriage and two from his second.

On 15 April 2011 it was reported that Hækkerup was suffering from multiple system atrophy. He died from the disease on 22 December 2013.

Timeline
 1973–1976; Secretary, later Head of Social Affairs
 1976–1977; Vice Minister – Ministry of Education
 1977–1979; Head of Section, Ministry of Labour
 1977–1980; Course supervisors at the Danish School of Public Administration
 1981–1985; Consultant in Public Servant Organization
 1991–1993; Chairman of the Parliamentary Defense Committee
 1993–2000; Minister of Defense
 2001; Special Representative of the Secretary-General for Kosovo→ 10 December 2001; Acting Chairman of the Assembly of Kosovo
 2007–2010; Research Director, China Studies, Royal Danish Defence College
 2008–2009; Chairman of the Danish Defence Commission of 2008

References

External links 
UNMIK Official Biography 

1945 births
2013 deaths
Members of the Folketing
Social Democrats (Denmark) politicians
Recipients of the Order of the Cross of Terra Mariana, 1st Class
University of Copenhagen alumni
People from Frederiksberg
Danish Defence Ministers
Special Representatives of the Secretary-General of the United Nations